David Rain (2 May 1961 – 15 December 2015), known by his pen name Tom Arden,  was a British science fiction and fantasy writer. He was born in Australia. His main work is the five volume Orokon saga, as well as the novels Shadow Black, The Translation of Bastian Test and the Doctor Who novella Nightdreamers.

Arden was born in 1961 and grew up in Mount Gambier, South Australia. He wrote his first unpublished novel, Moon Escape at the age of seven and later studied English at the University of Adelaide, graduating with First Class Honours. Arden completed his Ph.D. thesis on Clarissa, the epic tale by 18th-century novelist Samuel Richardson.

In 1990, he moved to the United Kingdom, living in Northern Ireland and England. He lectured in English at Queen's University of Belfast for seven years. Since 2003, he lectured creative writing at Middlesex University, London.

Death
Arden died of cancer on 15 December 2015.

Bibliography

The Orokon
 The Harlequin's Dance (1997)
 The King and Queen of Swords (1998)
 Sultan of the Moon and Stars (1999)
 Sisterhood of the Blue Storm (2000)
 Empress of the Endless Dream (2001)

Other novels
 Shadow Black (2002) – gothic mystery
 The Translation of Bastian Test (2005) – science fiction
 As David Rain: The Heat of the Sun (2012)
 As David Rain: Volcano Street (2014)

Other writings
 Nightdreamers (original novella) based on the television series Doctor Who.
 Short stories for UK publication Interzone: "The Indigenes" (IZ 136), "The Volvax Immersion" (IZ 143).
 Articles have been published in the British Fantasy Society magazine Prism.

References

External links
 Official Website
 

1961 births
2015 deaths
Australian science fiction writers
Australian fantasy writers
British science fiction writers
British fantasy writers
Deaths from cancer in England
20th-century pseudonymous writers
21st-century pseudonymous writers
University of Adelaide alumni
Academics of Queen's University Belfast
Academics of Middlesex University